Yukhym Dmytrovych Konoplya (born 26 August 1999) is a Ukrainian professional footballer who plays as a defender  for Shakhtar Donetsk in the Ukrainian Premier League.

Club career

Shakhtar Donetsk
Born in Donetsk, Konoplya is a product of Shakhtar Donetsk academy. He played with Shakhtar Donetsk in UEFA Youth League in the 2017–18 and 2018–19 seasons.

Desna Chernihiv
In the summer of 2019 he moved on loan to Desna Chernihiv and made his debut in the Ukrainian Premier League as a second-half substitute player in a winning home match against Vorskla Poltava on 3 August 2019. At the end of the season his club qualified for the UEFA Europa League for the first time in club history. In the summer of 2020 he agreed to extend his contract for one more year with Desna Chernihiv Konoplya played in the first European match in the history of the club against Wolfsburg in the 2020–21 UEFA Europa League third qualifying round at the AOK Stadion. On 30 September 2020 he played against Rukh Lviv in the Ukrainian Cup with the Chernihiv club qualifying for the round of 16. On 9 May 2021 he scored his first senior goal against Mariupol in the Ukrainian Premier League.

Shakhtar Donetsk

2021–22 season
In the summer of 2021 signed with Shakhtar Donetsk. On 21 August he made his debut for the club against Chornomorets Odesa at Chornomorets Stadium. On 22 September he won his first club trophy by clinching the 2021 Ukrainian Super Cup against Dynamo Kyiv at the NSC Olimpiyskyi in Kyiv, coming on as a substitute in the 88th minute. On 3 December, he scored his first goal in the Ukrainian Premier League against Lviv.

International career

Ukraine U20
Konoplya was part of Ukraine national under-20 football team that won the 2019 FIFA U-20 World Cup. He played a key role in Ukraine's success, appearing in six of the seven matches and making four  assists.

Ukraine U21
He was included in the Ukraine national under-21 football team, playing in five matches and winning the Valeriy Lobanovskyi Memorial Tournament in 2019 On 8 September 2020 he scored a goal against Finland in a 2021 UEFA European Under-21 Championship qualifier.

Ukraine
He was called up to the Ukrainian senior team for a friendly match against France and UEFA Nations League matches against Germany and Spain in October 2020, becoming the first Desna Chernihiv player to be called up to the national team. On 7 October he made his national debut against France at the Stade de France. On 14 November he played against Germany at Red Bull Arena in Leipzig.

Personal life
On 9 January 2022 he married Anastasiya Hladun.

Career statistics

Club

International

Honours
Shakhtar Donetsk
 Ukrainian Super Cup: 2021

Shakhtar Donetsk U19
 Under 19 Ukrainian Premier League runner-up: 2017–18

Ukraine U20
 FIFA U-20 World Cup: 2019

Ukraine U21
 Valeriy Lobanovskyi Memorial Tournament: 2019

References

External links
From Official the website of FC Desna Chernihiv
 
 

1999 births
Living people
Footballers from Donetsk
Ukrainian footballers
FC Desna Chernihiv players
Ukrainian Premier League players
Association football defenders
Ukraine youth international footballers
Ukraine under-21 international footballers
Ukraine international footballers